Relative Insight is a technology and analytics firm founded in 2012 with offices in London and Lancaster. The firm uses technology originally created for crime detection to help brands interact with their audiences. Using comparative language algorithms, the technology platform compares language sets to detect linguistic and attitudinal differences between consumers and brands, and language differences over time. It detects statistically significant differences in words, topics, style and grammar to help brands determine how to interact with consumers and in what context.

Clients are a mixture of brands as well as creative and media agencies including R/GA, Disney, Unilever, Havas, and Pearson. Relative Insight analyses the way a brand's target audience speaks online – for example on Facebook, Twitter, in comments and on forums – and provides insight to the brand on how best to appeal to this audience.

History 
Relative Insight was spun out of Lancaster University in 2012 by founders Phil Greenwood and James Walkerdine, who were joined by Ben Hookway and Rich Wilson in 2013.  The technology was originally developed through a 10-year research project with Lancaster University's linguistic and cyber security departments to detect masquerading by criminals online by analyzing language use. The first commercial application of the research was in law enforcement. The company continues that work and applies the same technology in the marketing sector.

References 

Companies based in Lancaster, Lancashire
British companies established in 2012